This list comprises buildings, sites, structures, districts, and objects in the City of Milwaukee, Wisconsin, which are listed on the National Register of Historic Places. There are 283 NRHP sites listed in Milwaukee County, including 72 outside the City of Milwaukee included in the National Register of Historic Places listings in Milwaukee County, Wisconsin and 211 in the city, listed below. One previously listed site in the city has been removed.

Current listings

|}

Former listing

|}

See also
National Register of Historic Places listings in Milwaukee County, Wisconsin
List of National Historic Landmarks in Wisconsin
National Register of Historic Places listings in Wisconsin

References

History of Milwaukee
Milwaukee
Milwaukee, Wisconsin

Milwaukee-related lists